These are the results of the men's C-1 slalom competition in canoeing at the 1972 Summer Olympics. The C-1 (canoe single) event is raced by one-man canoes through a whitewater course.  The venue for the 1972 Olympic competition was in Augsburg.

Medalists

Results
The 22 competitors each took two runs through the whitewater slalom course on August 28. The best time of the two runs counted for the event.

References

1972 Summer Olympics official report Volume 3. p. 497. 
1972 men's C-1 results

Men's Slalom C-1
Men's events at the 1972 Summer Olympics